Scepastocarpus is a genus of fungi in the family Laboulbeniaceae. A monotypic genus, it contains the single species Scepastocarpus peritheciiformis.

References

External links
Scepastocarpus at Index Fungorum

Laboulbeniomycetes
Monotypic Laboulbeniomycetes genera